"Believers" is a song recorded by American country music artist Joe Nichols.  It was released in May 2009 as the first single from the album Old Things New.  The song reached #26 on the Billboard Hot Country Songs chart.  The song was written by Ashley Gorley, Wade Kirby and Bill Luther.

Chart performance

References

2009 singles
2009 songs
Joe Nichols songs
Songs written by Ashley Gorley
Songs written by Wade Kirby
Songs written by Bill Luther (songwriter)
Song recordings produced by Brent Rowan
Song recordings produced by Mark Wright (record producer)
Show Dog-Universal Music singles